The Nichols Islands are an island group located inside western Coronation Gulf, south of Victoria Island, in the Kitikmeot Region, Nunavut, Canada. Other islands in the vicinity include Blaze Island, Seven Mile Island, Kigirktaryuk Island, Onitkok Island, and the Couper Islands.

References

 Nichols Islands at the Atlas of Canada

Islands of Coronation Gulf
Uninhabited islands of Kitikmeot Region